Wabedo Lake is a lake in Cass County, Minnesota, in the United States.

Overview 
Wabedo Lake was named for an Ojibwe warrior killed by Sioux.

Anglers, a person who fishes with a rod and line, can anticipate to catch 15 different types of fish. These 15 different fish species are: Black Bullhead, Black Crappie, Bluegill, Brown Bullhead, Largemouth Bass, Muskellunge (Muskie), Northern Pike, Pumpkinseed, Rock Bass, Smallmouth Bass, Walleye, White Sucker, Yellow Bullhead and Yellow Perch.

See also
List of lakes in Minnesota

References

Lakes of Minnesota
Lakes of Cass County, Minnesota